The U.S. Department of Labor, Office of Inspector General (DOL OIG) is one of the Inspector General offices created by the Inspector General Act of 1978.

The Inspector General for the Department of Labor is charged with investigating and auditing department programs to combat waste, fraud, and abuse.

The Office of Inspector General (OIG) at the U.S. Department of Labor (DOL) conducts audits to review the effectiveness, efficiency, economy, and integrity of all DOL programs and operations, including those performed by its contractors and grantees. This work is conducted in order to determine whether: the programs and operations are in compliance with the applicable laws and regulations; DOL resources are efficiently and economically being utilized; and DOL programs achieve their intended results. The OIG also conducts criminal, civil, and administrative investigations into alleged violations of federal laws relating to DOL programs, operations, and personnel. In addition, the OIG conducts criminal investigations to combat the influence of labor racketeering and organized crime in the nation's labor unions in three areas: employee benefit plans, labor-management relations, and internal union affairs. The OIG also works with other law enforcement partners on human trafficking matters.

History of Inspectors General

References 

Labor Office of Inspector General, Department of
United States Department of Labor
United States Department of Labor agencies